The Petronas Basketball Team was a Malaysian semi-professional basketball team competing in the now-defunct Malaysian Basketball League.

History

Last roster 

Other Team Personnel

  Andy Zeng (Team Manager) 
  David Zamar (Head Coach)

References

External links 
 Team profile on Asia-Basket.com website
 Malaysia Basketball Association official website
 Malaysian basketball on Asia-Basket.com website
 National Basketball League official website
 ASEAN Basketball League official website
 Kuala Lumpur Dragons official website
 Kuala Lumpur Dragons on Facebook

Former Malaysia National Basketball League teams
Petronas